The Hungarian Helsinki Committee (HHC) is a non-governmental human rights organization founded in 1989 and based in Budapest, Hungary. The HHC is a member of the International Helsinki Federation for Human Rights and the European Council on Refugees and Exiles.
The HHC defines itself as monitoring the respect for human rights protected by international human rights instruments, to inform the public about human rights violations and to provide victims of human rights abuse with free legal assistance.
It is also linked with the OMCT and is a member organisation of the European Council on Refugees and Exiles (ECRE).

The Hungarian Helsinki Committee is also active in the rights of asylum seekers, condition of people detained, the stateless and people residing in foreign countries in need of legal assistance.

References

External links
 HHC Official Site

1989 establishments in Hungary
Human rights organisations based in Hungary
Organizations established in 1989